Acmaeodera plagiaticauda is a species of metallic wood-boring beetle in the family Buprestidae. It lives in North America.

References

Further reading

 
 
 
 
 

plagiaticauda
Beetles described in 1878